Mohamed Belhadi (born 13 July 1986) is an Algerian footballer who plays for MC El Eulma as a defender.

References

External links

1986 births
Living people
Association football defenders
Algerian footballers
MC El Eulma players
USM Bel Abbès players
People from Blida
21st-century Algerian people